Helen Ann Richardson Khan (born as Helen Ann Richardson; 21 November 1938), known mononymously as Helen, is an Indian actress and dancer. She has appeared in over 1000 films, making her a prolific performer in Hindi cinema. She is known for her supporting, character roles and guest appearances in a career spanning seventy years.

Helen has received two Filmfare Awards, and is often cited as one of the most popular nautch dancers of her time. In 2009, Helen was awarded with the Padma Shri by the Government of India. She was the inspiration for four films and a book.

Early life and background
Helen Ann Richardson was born on 21 November 1938 in Rangoon, Burma to an Anglo-Indian father and a Burmese mother. Her father's name was George Desmier and her mother's name was Marlene. She has a brother named Roger and a sister named Jennifer. Their father died during World War II. The family then trekked to Dibrugarh of Assam in 1943 in order to escape from the Japanese occupation of Burma. Helen told Filmfare during an interview in 1964: ...we trekked alternately through wilderness and hundreds of villages, surviving on the generosity of people, for we were penniless, with no food and few clothes. Occasionally, we met British soldiers who provided us with transport, found us refuge and treated our blistered feet and bruised bodies and fed us. By the time we reached Dibrugarh in Assam, our group had been reduced to half. Some had fallen ill and been left behind, some had died of starvation and disease. My mother miscarried along the way. The survivors were admitted to the Dibrugarh hospital for treatment. Mother and I had been virtually reduced to skeletons and my brother's condition was critical. We spent two months in hospital. When we recovered, we moved to Calcutta, and sadly my brother died there due to smallpox". She quit her schooling to support her family because her mother's salary as a nurse was not enough to feed a family of four. In a documentary called Queen of the Nautch girls, Helen said she was 19 years old in 1958 when she got her first big break in Howrah Bridge.

Career
Helen was introduced to Bollywood (Hindi cinema) when a family friend, an actress known as Cuckoo, helped her find jobs as a group dancer in the films Shabistan (1951) and Awaara (1951). She was soon working regularly and was featured as a solo dancer in films such as Alif Laila (1954) and Hoor-e-Arab (1955). She also featured as Street singer in film Mayurpankh (1954).

She got her major break in 1958, aged 19, when she performed on the song "Mera Naam Chin Chin Chu" in Shakti Samanta's film, Howrah Bridge, which was sung by Geeta Dutt. After that, offers started pouring in throughout the 1960s and 1970s. During her initial career, Geeta Dutt sang many songs for her. In the plot of many of the films of this period, Helen performs a song or dance then is killed, leaving the film's "good woman" available for the hero.

The Bollywood playback singer Asha Bhosle also frequently sang for Helen, particularly during the 1960s and the early 1970s. She was nominated for the Filmfare Best Supporting Actress Award in 1965 for her role as Kitty Kelly in Gumnaam. She played dramatic roles in films like China Town and Sachaai starring Shammi Kapoor which went on to be very successful at the box office. She also played a sensitive character in the film Chhote Sarkar (1974) starring Shammi Kapoor and Sadhana. With Shammi Kapoor she did many hit dance numbers like 'Suku suku' in Junglee, ' Yamma yamma' in Chinatown, 'O haseena zulfonwali' in Teesri Manzil, 'Hai pyar ka hi naam' in Singapore, and 'Muqabla humse na karo' in Prince.

She performed onstage in London, Paris, and Hong Kong. In 1973, Helen, Queen of the Nautch Girls, a 30-minute documentary film from Merchant Ivory Films, was released. Anthony Korner directed and narrated the film. A book about Helen was published by Jerry Pinto in 2006, titled The Life and Times of an H-Bomb, which went on to win the National Film Award for Best Book on Cinema in 2007. Writer Salim Khan helped her get roles in some of the films he was co-scripting with Javed Akhtar: Immaan Dharam, Don, Dostana, and Sholay. This was followed by a role in Mahesh Bhatt's film Lahu Ke Do Rang (1979), for which she won a Filmfare Best Supporting Actress Award. In 1999 Helen was given India's Filmfare lifetime achievement award.

Helen officially retired from movies in 1983, but she has since then appeared in a few guest roles such as Khamoshi: The Musical (1996) and Mohabbatein (2000). She also made a special appearance as the mother of real-life step-son Salman Khan's character in Hum Dil De Chuke Sanam. She also appeared in Humko Deewana Kar Gaye in 2006.

Helen was selected for the Padma Shri awards of 2009 along with Aishwarya Rai and Akshay Kumar. She appeared as a judge in the semifinals and finals of India's 2009 Dancing Queen television series.

Personal life
 
Helen's first marriage was in 1957 to film director Prem Narayan Arora of Dil Daulat Duniya fame, who was 27 years older than her. She divorced him in 1974. In 1981, Helen married Salim Khan, a prominent Bollywood screenplay writer. Khan was already married and the father of four children; Helen joined the Khan family and had a large role (along with Khan and his first wife Salma) in keeping the family united. All of Helen's step-children have bonded closely with her, and Helen is almost invariably accompanied in public appearances by Salma Khan, Salim's first wife. She has a daughter, Arpita Khan, with her 2nd husband, Salim Khan. Helen is a Christian.

Awards and honors

 Padma Shri, a civilian honour from the Indian government (2009)
 Nominated – Filmfare Award for Best Supporting Actress – Gumnaam (1966)
 Nominated – Filmfare Award for Best Supporting Actress – Shikaar (1969)
 Nominated – Filmfare Award for Best Supporting Actress – Elaan (1972)
 Won – Filmfare Award for Best Supporting Actress – Lahu Ke Do Rang (1980)
 Nominated – Filmfare Award for Best Supporting Actress – Khamoshi: The Musical (1997)
 1999 – Filmfare Lifetime Achievement Award

Selected filmography
                      
 Awaara (1951, as background dancer)   
 Shabistan (1951, as background dancer)                                   
 Alif Laila (1953, as background dancer)
Mayurpankh(1954,as street dancer)
 Santosham (1955, Telugu)                            
 Halaku (1956)
 Mr. Lambu (1956)
 Yahudi Ki Ladki (1957)
 Dongallo Dora (1957, Telugu)
 Chalti Ka Naam Gaadi (1958)
 Howrah Bridge (1958)
 Yahudi (1958)
 Bhookailas (1958, Telugu)
 Uthama Puthiran (1958)
 Sawan (1959)
 Anari (1959)
 Hum Hindustani (1960)
 Abdulla (1960)
 Return of Mr. Superman (1960)
 Ek Phool Char Kante (1960)
 Bahana (1960)
 Dil Apna Aur Preet Parai (1960)
 Baghdad Thirudan (1960) (Tamil film)
 Gunga Jumna (1961)
 Umar Qaid (1961)
 Mr. India (1961)
 Sampoorna Ramayana (1961)
 Half Ticket (1962)
 Bombay Ka Chor (1962)
 China Town (1962)
 Sunheri Nagin (1963)
 Shikari (1963)
 Mulzim (1963)
 Taj Mahal (1963)
 Aaya Toofan (1964)
 Cha Cha Cha (1964)
 Woh Kaun Thi? (1964)
 Zindagi (1964)
 Mohabbat Isko Kahete Hain (1965)
 Faisla (1965)
 Gumnaam (1965)
 Khandan (1965)
 Kaajal (1965)
Love And Murder (1966)
 Yeh Raat Phir Na Aayegi (1966)
 Teesri Manzil (1966)
 Dus Lakh (1966)
 Chaddian Di Doli (1966) [Punjabi film]
 Bahu Begum (1967)
 C.I.D. 909 (1967)
 Hare Kaanch Ki Chooriyan (1967)
 Jaal (1967)
 Jewel Thief (1967)
 Shikar (1968)
 Talaash (1969)
 Prince (1969)
 Bikhre Moti (1969)
 Bhai Bahen (1969)
 Inteqam (1969)
 Aansoo Ban Gaye Phool (1969)
 Pyar Ka Sapna (1969)
 Pagla Kahin Ka (1970)
 The Train (1970)
 Tum Haseen Main Jawaan (1970)
 Bombay Talkie (1970)
 Puraskar (1970)
 Caravan (1971)
 Hulchul (1971)
 Hungama (1971)
 Adhikar (1971)
 Upaasna (1971)
 Man Mandir (1971)
 Parwana (1971)
 Sange Muzhangu (1972, Tamil film)
 Mere Jeevan Saathi (1972)
 Doctor X (1972)
 Rakhi Aur Hathkadi (1972)
 Dil Daulat Duniya (1972)
 Apradh (1972)
 Bhale Huchcha (1972, Kannada)
 Do Gaz Zameen Ke Neeche (1972)
 Dharkan (1972)
 Heera (1973)
 Anamika (1973)
 Aaj Ki Taaza Khabar (1973)
 Chhote Sarkaar (1974)
 Geetaa Mera Naam (1974)
 Benaam (1974)
 Madhosh (1974)
 Sholay (1975)
 Zakhmee (1975)
 Kaala Sona (1975)
 Saazish (1975)
 Aaj Ka Ye Ghar (1976)
 Bairaag (1976)
 Ginny Aur Johnny (1976)
 Raees (1976)
 Immaan Dharam (1977)
 Inkaar (1977)
 Khoon Pasina (1977)
 Amar Akbar Anthony (1977)
 Chala Murari Hero Banne (1977)
 Don (1978)
 Besharam (1978)
 Swarag Narak (1978)
 Phandebaaz (1978)
 Lahu Ke Do Rang (1979)
 The Great Gambler (1979)
 Hema Hemeelu (1979, Telugu)
 Allauddinum Albhutha Vilakkum (1979, Tamil-Malayalam)
 Billa (1980, Tamil)
 Abdullah  (1980)
 Dostana (1980)
 Ram Balram (1980)
 Shaan (1980)
 Bulundi (1981)
 Josh (1981)
 Heeron Ka Chor (1982)
 Sawaal (1982)
 Aladin dan Lampu Wasiat (1982, Indonesian Movie)
 Haadsa (1983)
 Bond 303 (1985)
 Akayla (1991)
 Khamoshi: The Musical (1996)
 Saazish (1998)
 Hum Dil De Chuke Sanam (1999)
 Mohabbatein (2000)
 Shararat (2002)
 Dil Ne Jise Apna Kahaa (2004)
 Anjaane: The Unknown (2005)
 Humko Deewana Kar Gaye (2006)
 Marigold (2007)
 Dunno Y... Na Jaane Kyon (2010)
 One Room Kitchen (2011) (Marathi film) ..... Rosy Aunty
 Jodi Breakers (2012)
 Heroine (2012)
 Pagli Shaadi Go Dadi (2021)

See also
 Desperately Seeking Helen

References

Sources

External links

 
 
 Rediff profile, rediff.com; accessed 11 December 2014. 
 Huffington Post profile; accessed 11 December 2014.

Indian film actresses
Indian television actresses
1938 births
Living people
Filmfare Awards winners
Filmfare Lifetime Achievement Award winners
Recipients of the Padma Shri in arts
Actresses in Hindi cinema
Actresses from Mumbai
Actresses of European descent in Indian films
Anglo-Burmese people
Anglo-Indian people
Burmese emigrants to India
Indian people of Anglo-Burmese descent
20th-century Indian actresses
21st-century Indian actresses
Indian Christians
Salim Khan family
People from Yangon
Actresses in Malayalam cinema
Actresses in Tamil cinema
Actresses in Kannada cinema
Actresses in Telugu cinema